The 2021 Mountain West Conference men's basketball tournament was the postseason men's basketball tournament for the Mountain West Conference. It was held on March 10–13, 2021 at the Thomas & Mack Center on the campus of University of Nevada, Las Vegas, in Las Vegas, Nevada. The tournament champion, San Diego State, received the Mountain West's automatic bid to the NCAA tournament.

Seeds
All 11 MW schools were eligible to participate in the tournament. Teams were seeded by conference record with a tiebreaker system to seed teams with identical percentages. The top five teams received byes into the tournament quarterfinals. The remaining teams played in the first round. Tie-breaking procedures remained unchanged from the 2020 tournament.
 Head-to-head record between the tied teams
 Record against the highest-seeded team not involved in the tie, going down through the seedings as necessary
 Higher NET

Schedule

Bracket

* denotes overtime period

References

Tournament
Mountain West Conference men's basketball tournament
Basketball competitions in the Las Vegas Valley
College basketball tournaments in Nevada
Mountain West Conference men's basketball tournament
Mountain West Conference men's basketball tournament
College sports tournaments in Nevada